Eulogy IV is an EP by the Illinois black metal band Nachtmystium.

Originally released by Total Holocaust Records in 2004, it has been reissued on CD and LP by Southern Lord Records and Kreation Records with additional bonus tracks.

Track listing

Total Holocaust Records version (2004)
 My Vengeance
 Eulogy IV
 The Wound Which Cannot Heal 
 You Get Nothing
 Kronet (Ildjarn cover)
 Bak to Lysemde Oyne (Ildjarn cover)
 Satanic Blood (Von cover)

Southern Lord Records version (2005) (SUNN42.5)
 "My Vengeance"
 "Eulogy IV"
 "Bleed for Thee"
 "The Wound Which Cannot Heal"
 "You Get Nothing"
 "Charioteer (Temple Song)" (Earth cover)
 "Stemmen Fra Tarnet" (Burzum cover)
 "Satanic Blood" (Von cover)
 "Antichrist Messiah/My Vengeance" (Live 12/04)

Kreation Records version (2006)
 My Vengeance
 Eulogy IV
 Bleed for Thee
 The Wound Which Cannot Heal
 You Get Nothing
 Charioteer (Temple Song) (Earth cover)
 Stemmen Fra Tårnet (Burzum cover)

Century Media version (2006)
 My Vengeance
 Eulogy IV
 Bleed for Thee
 The Wound Which Cannot Heal
 You Get Nothing

Personnel

Additional personnel
 Christophe Szpajdel — logo

Nachtmystium albums
2004 albums
Southern Lord Records EPs
Century Media Records EPs